

The following lists events that happened during 1910 in Afghanistan.

Incumbents
 Monarch – Habibullah Khan

Summer 1910
A joint British and Afghan commission appointed to settle tribal disputes arising out of raids and counter-raids on each side of the British-Afghan border commences its work, starting from the Kurram Valley. Its labours are brought to a satisfactory conclusion before the close of the year. The agreement reached provides that outlaws from either side shall be removed to a distance of not less than fifty miles from the border, and orders to give effect to this within British territory are at once issued.

 
Afghanistan
Years of the 20th century in Afghanistan
Afghanistan
1910s in Afghanistan